Arcade Center Farm is a historic home and farm complex in Arcade, Wyoming County, New York.  The farmhouse is a Greek Revival-style frame structure built about 1835 with a -story main block and 1-story wings.  The farm occupies  and, in addition to the farmhouse, includes a historic 19th century barn. The property includes a number of other non-contributing structures.

It was listed on the National Register of Historic Places in 2004.

References

External links
Arcade Center Farm - Arcade, New York - U.S. National Register of Historic Places on Waymarking.com
The Barn at Arcade Center Farm - Arcade, New York - Barns on Waymarking.com

Houses on the National Register of Historic Places in New York (state)
Greek Revival houses in New York (state)
Houses completed in 1835
Houses in Wyoming County, New York
Wooden houses in the United States
National Register of Historic Places in Wyoming County, New York